John William Grant (24 September 1915 – 1 December 1983) was an Australian rules footballer who played for the Geelong Football Club and Fitzroy Football Club in the Victorian Football League (VFL).

Family
He married Dulcie May Ellis (?–1989), in Geelong, on Saturday, 29 April 1939. He died on 1 December 1983, and was buried at Mount Duneed Cemetery, Mount Duneed, Victoria.

Stawell Gift
He had exceptional pace, winning the 1938 130-yard Stawell Gift in eleven and eleven-sixteenths of a second, off a handicap of 11½ yards.

Football
Grant usually played on the half forward or half back flank.

A member of Geelong's premiership team in 1937, Grant won their best and fairest award in 1939. He was their leading goalkicker in 1940, with 47 goals. In 1942 he moved to Fitzroy and spent two seasons with the club, topping their goalkicking in 1942 with 43 goals. He returned to Geelong in 1945 and captained them the following season.

War service
He served in the RAAF. LAC Grant enlisted in February 1942, and was discharged, "on compassionate grounds", in June 1945.

Footnotes

References
 World War II Service Record: John William Grant (50710), National Archives of Australia.

External links

Paul Daffey, "The ten best footballers at the Stawell Gift" (The Sunday Age, 27 March 2005)
Geelong Football Club Honour Roll

Australian rules footballers from Victoria (Australia)
Fitzroy Football Club players
Geelong Football Club players
Geelong Football Club Premiership players
Carji Greeves Medal winners
Stawell Gift winners
1915 births
1983 deaths
One-time VFL/AFL Premiership players